Grand Forks is the third-largest city in the state of North Dakota (after Fargo and Bismarck) and the county seat of Grand Forks County. According to the 2020 census, the city's population was 59,166. Grand Forks, along with its twin city of East Grand Forks, Minnesota, forms the center of the Grand Forks, ND-MN Metropolitan Statistical Area, which is often called Greater Grand Forks or the Grand Cities.

Located on the western banks of the north-flowing Red River of the North, in a flat region known as the Red River Valley, the city is prone to flooding. The Red River Flood of 1997 devastated the city. Originally called Les Grandes Fourches by French fur traders from Canada, who had long worked and lived in the region, steamboat captain Alexander Griggs platted a community after being forced to winter there. The post office was established in 1870, and the town was incorporated on February 22, 1881. The city was named for its location at the fork of the Red River and the Red Lake River.

Initially dependent on local agriculture, the city's economy has since broadened to include a wide variety of industries, including higher education, defense, health care, manufacturing, food processing, and scientific research. Grand Forks is served by Grand Forks International Airport and Grand Forks Air Force Base. The city's University of North Dakota is the oldest institution of higher education in the state. The Alerus Center and Ralph Engelstad Arena host athletic and other events, while the Empire Arts Center and Chester Fritz Auditorium are the city's largest cultural venues.

History

Prior to settlement by Europeans, the area where the city developed, at the forks of the Red River and Red Lake River for thousands of years, had been an important meeting and trading point for Native Americans. Early French explorers, fur trappers, and traders called the area Les Grandes Fourches, meaning "The Grand Forks". By the 1740s, French fur trappers relied on Les Grandes Fourches as an important trading post. This was French colonial territory.

The United States acquired the territory from British Rupert's Land with the Treaty of 1818, but indigenous tribes  dominated the area until the late 19th century. After years of warfare, the United States made treaties to extinguish the land claims of the Ojibwe and other  Native American peoples. When a U.S. post office was established on the site on June 15, 1870, the name was changed to the English "Grand Forks". Alexander Griggs, a steamboat captain, is regarded as "The Father of Grand Forks". Griggs' steamboat froze in the Red River on a voyage in late 1870, forcing the captain and his crew to spend the winter camping at Grand Forks. Griggs platted a community in 1875, and Grand Forks was officially incorporated on February 22, 1881.

Thousands of settlers were attracted to the Dakota Territory in the 1870s and 1880s for its cheap land, and the population began to rise. Many established small family farms, but some investors bought thousands of acres for bonanza farms, where they supervised the cultivation and harvesting of wheat as a commodity crop. The city grew quickly after the arrival of the Great Northern Railway in 1880 and the Northern Pacific Railway in 1887. In 1883, the University of North Dakota was established, six years before North Dakota was admitted as an independent state born from the Dakota Territory.
During the first half of the 20th century, new residential neighborhoods were developed south and west of downtown Grand Forks. In the 1920s, the state-owned North Dakota Mill and Elevator was constructed on the city's north side.

In 1954, Grand Forks was chosen as the site for an Air Force base. Grand Forks Air Force Base brought thousands of new jobs and residents to the community. The military base and the University of North Dakota became integral to the city's economy. With construction of federal highways, during the postwar years residential and business development became suburbanized, spreading to new areas as land was available. Interstate 29 was built on the western side of the city, and two enclosed shopping malls—South Forks Plaza and Columbia Mall—were built on the south side.

The Red River had a history of seasonal flooding, aggravated by the broad ancient lake bed that formed the Red River Valley. The 1997 Red River flood caused extensive damage in the city. Fargo was upstream from the bulk of the flood waters that season, and Winnipeg had built an extensive system of flood control structures in the 1960s. In 1997, Grand Forks suffered the most damage of any major city in the Red River Valley. During the height of the flooding, a major fire destroyed 11 buildings in the downtown area. The government began developing a new levee system to protect the city, which was completed 10 years later. It required the relocation of numerous residents, as some neighborhoods were emptied for this construction.

The floodplain bordering the Red River was later converted into a large park known as the Greater Grand Forks Greenway. This provided new recreation space for city residents on both sides of the river, as well as space for future floodwaters to be absorbed naturally by trees and other plants, without damage to infrastructure.

New public and private developments have continued to expand Grand Forks's footprint since the 1997 flood. Two new, large sports venues opened in 2001: the Alerus Center and the Ralph Engelstad Arena. Six years later, the Winnipeg-based Canad Inns hotel chain added a 13-story hotel and waterpark connected to the Alerus Center. Grand Forks also surpassed pre-flood level population, area employment, and taxable sales in 2007.

Geography

Grand Forks is on the western bank of the Red River of the North in an area known as the Red River Valley. The term "forks" refers to the forking of the Red River with the Red Lake River near downtown Grand Forks. Since it is in one of the flattest parts of the world, the city has few differences in elevation. There are no lakes within the city limits of Grand Forks, but the meandering Red River and the English Coulee flow through the community and provide some break in the terrain.

The Red River Valley is the result of an ancient glacier carving its way south during the last ice age. Once the glacier receded, it formed a glacial lake called Lake Agassiz. The valley is formed from the ancient lake bed. The ancient beaches can still be seen as rolling hills west of the city.

Cityscape

Grand Forks has several distinct neighborhoods. The area adjacent to the Red River developed first; this is where some of the oldest neighborhoods, including the downtown area, can be found. The area between downtown and the University of North Dakota campus was another early growth area, and historic properties can be found here, as well.

Downtown Grand Forks contains many recognized historic buildings. It is the governmental center of the city and county. It is also used as a gathering place for large community events and festivals. A farmer's market takes place every Saturday from mid-June to mid-September in the Town Square at the corner of 3rd Street S. and DeMers Avenue.

In 2006, city leaders and developers announced plans to convert older office buildings into high-end condos and apartments, and to construct new buildings for the same purpose to provide for residents downtown. Directly south of downtown, the streets of the Near Southside Historic District are lined with classic houses. Reeves Drive was once one of the city's most fashionable neighborhoods. It has many historic mansions exhibiting several unique architectural styles. This neighborhood has areas of original granitoid paving, several historic churches, and Lincoln Drive Park. The Near Southside neighborhood has been designated as a "national historic district" and is listed on the National Register of Historic Places.

The newer neighborhoods of Grand Forks developed in the city's southern and western parts. The 32nd Avenue South corridor has been the commercial center of the city since 1978, when the Columbia Mall opened. Many big box stores and restaurants are now along the avenue. A large strip mall, called the Grand Forks Marketplace, opened in 2001 near the Columbia Mall.

University Village is a new commercial district built on vacant lands owned by the University of North Dakota. The centerpiece of the Village is the Ralph Engelstad Arena, used by the university's North Dakota men's ice hockey team. All the buildings in the village have been built in a style similar style to those on the nearby UND campus. Restaurants and retail stores, as well as the university bookstore, were developed in the area to stimulate community life. In 2006, the university opened a new wellness center for its students on the village's west side.

Climate

Due to its location in the Great Plains and its distance from both mountains and oceans, Grand Forks has a humid continental climate (Köppen: Dfb), USDA Plant Hardiness Zone 4a. It has four very distinct seasons and great variation in temperatures over very short periods of time. Its location in the flat Red River Valley makes the city susceptible to spring flooding from the Red River of the North, and year-round windy conditions.

As there are no nearby mountain ranges or bodies of water to ameliorate the climatic conditions, Grand Forks lies exposed to numerous weather systems, including bitterly cold Arctic high pressure systems. The city has long, cold, and snowy winters. Summers are often warm to hot and often quite humid with frequent thunderstorms. Although warm weather normally ends soon after Labor Day, a few warm days sometimes occur as late as October. Spring and autumn are short and highly variable seasons.

The daily mean temperatures of the Grand Forks winters are associated with subarctic climates with frequent subzero temperatures. Due to the extended warm period of daily means above  from May to September, the city's climate is still classified within the humid continental temperature range.

Demographics

2010 census
As of the census of 2010, there were 52,838 people, 22,260 households, and 11,275 families in the city. The racial makeup of the city was 89.7% White, 2.0% African American, 2.9% Native American, 2.2% Asian (0.72% Bhutanese, 0.67% Chinese, 0.4% Indian, 0.36% Filipino), 0.7% from other races, and 2.5% from two or more races. Hispanic or Latino of any race were 2.8% of the population.

There were 22,260 households, of which 24.3% had children under the age of 18 living with them, 37.3% were married couples living together, 9.7% had a female householder with no husband present, 3.7% had a male householder with no wife present, and 49.3% were non-families. 34.8% of all households were made up of individuals, and 8.6% had someone living alone who was 65 years of age or older. The average household size was 2.21 and the average family size was 2.87.

The median age in the city was 28.4 years. 18.4% of residents were under the age of 18; 24.6% were between the ages of 18 and 24; 25.1% were from 25 to 44; 21.7% were from 45 to 64; and 10.1% were 65 years of age or older. The gender makeup of the city was 51.2% male and 48.8% female.

2000 census
As of the census of 2000, there were 49,321 people, 19,677 households, and 11,058 families residing in the city.

The city's racial makeup was 93.4% White, 0.9% African American, 2.8% Native American, 1.0% Asian, 0.1% Pacific Islander, 0.6% from other races, and 1.4% from two or more races. Hispanic or Latino of any race were 1.9% of the population. The top six ancestry groups were Norwegian (36.4%), German (34.7%), Irish (10.6%), French (6.5%), Polish (6.2%), English (6.1%). There were 21.4% of the population under the age of 18, 22.9% from 18 to 24, 27.7% from 25 to 44, 18.3% from 45 to 64, and 9.8% who were 65 years of age or older. The median age was 28 years. For every 100 females, there were 102.0 males. For every 100 females age 18 and over, there were 100.2 males.

Of the 19,677 households, 28.7% had children under the age of 18 living with them, 43.2% were married couples living together, 10.0% had a female householder with no husband present, and 43.8% were non-families. 31.4% of all households were made up of individuals, and 8.5% had someone living alone who was 65 years of age or older. The average household size was 2.3 and the average family size was 3.0. The median income for a household in the city was $34,194, and the median income for a family was $47,491. Males had a median income of $30,703 versus $21,573 for females. The per capita income for the city was $18,395. About 9.3% of families and 14.6% of the population were below the poverty line, including 14.6% of those under age 18 and 7.7% of those age 65 or over.

Economy
The economy of Grand Forks is not dominated by any one industry or sector. While agriculture continues to play a role in the area's economy, the city of Grand Forks now has a relatively diverse economy that includes public and private employers in sectors such as education, defense, health care, manufacturing, and food processing. The state and federal governments are two of the largest employers in the Grand Forks area. The University of North Dakota, in the heart of the city, is the largest employer in the metropolitan area. Grand Forks Air Force Base, just west of the city, employs a large number of civilian workers in addition to its military personnel. Altru Health System is the largest private employer in Grand Forks.

Largest employers
According to the City's 2018 Comprehensive Annual Financial Report, the largest employers in the city are:

Major manufacturers in Grand Forks include wind turbine manufacturer LM Wind Fiber and light aircraft manufacturer Cirrus Design. Major food producers include potato processor J. R. Simplot Company and the state-owned North Dakota Mill and Elevator, the nation's largest flour mill. Amazon.com and SEI Information Technologies both operate call centers in Grand Forks. Other large private employers in the city include the locally owned Alerus Financial branch of banks, Home of Economy, and the locally owned Hugo's chain of supermarkets.

The retail and service sector is also an important part of the economy. The historic center of shopping in Grand Forks was the downtown area. Today, downtown is home to small shops, bars, and restaurants. The south end of Grand Forks has become another major retail district, with three large shopping centers. The oldest, Grand Cities Mall, is on South Washington Street and contains small, locally owned stores and two churches. With about 70 stores, the city's largest indoor mall is Columbia Mall, which is anchored by J.C. Penney and Scheels. The newest major shopping center is the Grand Forks Marketplace power center mall, which features Best Buy, Lowe's, Target and several smaller stores. Due to its proximity to Canada, the Greater Grand Forks area attracts many shoppers from Manitoba.

Economic development
The city government is involved in the economic development process, helping firms grow and attracting new firms. A portion of sales tax revenues is set aside for this, some going into the Grand Forks Growth Fund. Companies can request low-interest loans or grants from this fund provided they meet certain criteria, such as paying a relatively high wage and doing most of their business outside the city's trade region. The city also contributes to the Grand Forks Region Economic Development Corporation (EDC), a public-private organization that receives funding from banks and other major businesses. The EDC plays a consulting role for businesses, such as identifying suitable sites for expansion or assembling public funding packages. Its other key role is to vet businesses to see if they are suitable for funding by the Growth Fund.

Community leaders have long seen UND as an "economic engine" for the city. Besides its regular faculty, it also has business-like components such as the Energy and Environmental Research Center. UND hosts a technology incubator called the Center for Innovation. More recently, the University has been working to commercialize its research. A major thrust in that direction is the construction of a research park on the western fringes of the campus. Another potential economic opportunity for the city is the addition of the unmanned aerial vehicle (UAV) mission to Grand Forks Air Force Base.

Culture

Arts and theatre

Due at least in part to the presence of the University of North Dakota, Grand Forks offers a variety of arts and cultural events. The North Dakota Museum of Art, on the UND campus, brings many nationally touring exhibits to Grand Forks as well as the work of regional artists. In addition to the Museum of Art, UND offers other gallery space for student art. UND also has Theater Arts and Music departments. Students stage theater productions each year at the Burtness Theater on campus. UND's Chester Fritz Auditorium also brings music and theater events to Grand Forks, including national touring companies of Broadway musicals.

The Greater Grand Forks Symphony Orchestra has been performing since 1905 and the Grand Forks Master Chorale was formed in 1983. Both groups stage productions each year at various locations in the community. The North Dakota Ballet Company is headquartered in Grand Forks and often performs at the Chester Fritz Auditorium. The Grand Forks City Band was formed in 1886 and still stages shows year round.

The Empire Arts Center, in downtown Grand Forks, is home to several cultural events throughout the year. The Empire, a 1919 movie theater, was restored after the Flood of 1997 and now includes performance space, a large movie screen, a gallery, and space for artists. The Fire Hall Theatre, also downtown, is used by community members to put on several theater productions each year. The Summer Performing Arts Company (SPA) is a popular summer arts program for area K–12 students. SPA stages three major musicals mid-July. The Myra Museum, on Belmont Road near the Greater Grand Forks Greenway, is a small history museum with exhibits that trace local history from the Ice Age, through settlement, and into the modern age. Other buildings on the Myra Museum grounds include the original 1868 Grand Forks Post Office, a 1917 one room school, and the historic Campbell House.

Sports

College sports are popular in Grand Forks, with an intense following for the University of North Dakota. The UND men's ice hockey team competes in the NCAA Division I level and has been the Frozen Four championship team eight times and the runner-up five times. The UND football team was the 2001 NCAA Division II champion and the 2003 runner-up. In 2006, the university announced that it would be moving its entire athletic program to Division I.

Grand Forks is home to two major indoor athletic arenas. The city-owned Alerus Center opened in 2001. The Alerus Center is home to the University of North Dakota football team and also plays host to a variety of other events including major concerts. The Alerus Center is the largest arena and convention center complex in the upper Midwest area. The University of North Dakota hockey teams compete in the Ralph Engelstad Arena, in the University Village district of the UND campus. Adjacent to the Ralph Engelstad Arena is the smaller Betty Engelstad Sioux Center. "The Betty" is the home of the University of North Dakota basketball and volleyball teams.

Recreation
The Grand Forks Park District, established in 1905, operates 14 neighborhood parks, 28 tennis courts, 2 swimming pools, and 3 splash parks. The parks include features such as playgrounds, baseball fields, softball fields, soccer fields, basketball courts, tennis courts, and picnic areas. Sertoma Park includes a Japanese garden. The Park District also operates eleven outdoor skating rinks and indoor ice arenas: Purpur Arena, Eagles Arena, Blueline Club Arena, and Gambucci Arena. The district also owns the Choice Health & Fitness.

There are several golf courses in the city and the surrounding area. The Park District operates the 18-hole, Arnold Palmer-designed, links style King's Walk Golf Course and the historic, 9-hole Lincoln Golf Course. The University of North Dakota operated the 9-hole Ray Richards Golf Course. However were forced to sell the course in 2016 leaving it abandoned. The 18-hole Grand Forks Country Club is directly south of the city. There are also golf courses in nearby East Grand Forks, Minnesota and Manvel, North Dakota.

The Greater Grand Forks Greenway is a large park that runs the length of the Red River in the city. It includes an extensive path system, large festival grounds, ski trails, and wildflower gardens. These paths are in The Greenway, next to major streets, and on the banks of the English Coulee. There are also two pedestrian/bicycle bridges that span the Red River, connecting Grand Forks' and East Grand Forks' paths.

University Park is one of the parks with an adjacent school, West Elementary School (1949), which was deliberately sited there to help serve the students' recreational and exercise needs.

Government

Grand Forks has a mayor-council government. The mayor, who is elected every four years, oversees the administration of city government and works directly with department heads to ensure the proper provision of services. The mayor of Grand Forks is former NHL hockey player and real estate developer Brandon Bochenski. Bochenski defeated Michael Brown in the June 9, 2020, mayoral election. Brown served as mayor from 2000 to 2020.

The city is divided into seven wards, with each ward electing a council member to a four-year term. The council meets twice a month and its two main committees, the Finance/Development Committee and Service/Safety Committee, each meet twice a month. All these meetings are broadcast on a local cable channel.

Education

Higher education

The University of North Dakota (UND), the state's oldest university and home to its only schools of medicine and law, is at Grand Forks. UND is known for its John D. Odegard School of Aerospace Sciences, which includes an Air Traffic Control Training program that in October 2009 the FAA ranked No.1 in the nation for the second consecutive year. UND and North Dakota State University make up the Red River Valley Research Corridor.

Northland Community and Technical College, a two-year school, is across the Red River in East Grand Forks. The University of Minnesota Crookston is in nearby Crookston, Minnesota.

Primary and secondary schools
The Grand Forks Public Schools system includes the Grand Forks and Grand Forks Air Force Base school districts. Enrollment is about 7,400. There is one singular Head Start program, ten elementary schools, a combined elementary and middle school (Twining), three middle schools (Schroeder, South, and Valley), two high schools (Central High and Red River High), an alternative high school, and an adult education program. Grand Forks Public Schools is governed by a nine-member board of elected representatives, separate from the city and county governments.

There are several primary schools that are not part of the public school system, including the state-operated North Dakota School for the Blind. There are two Catholic schools offering classes from kindergarten through sixth grade. The only private high school in the metropolitan area is Sacred Heart High School, a Catholic school, in East Grand Forks. There is a non-denominational Christian elementary and middle school in East Grand Forks.

Six of the city's Mid-Century Modern-style schools were listed on the National Register of Historic Places in 2020 for their architecture.

Media

The Grand Forks Herald is the major daily newspaper serving Grand Forks and the second most widely circulated newspaper in North Dakota with a daily circulation of around 31,000. The Exponent is a weekly newspaper published in East Grand Forks, Minnesota. The University of North Dakota also has its own student-published newspaper called The Dakota Student, which is published twice weekly during the school year.

The major AM radio station in Grand Forks is KNOX 1310, which is a news and talk station, also heard at 107.9 FM. Nonprofit KWTL 1370 AM broadcasts Catholic programming, also heard at 92.5 FM. Other commercial AM radio stations include sports station KKXL-AM 1440; classic rock station KGFK 1590, also heard at 95.7 FM; and news/talk KROX 1260, also heard at 92.1 FM. The city's FM stations include NPR affiliates KUND-FM 89.3, KFJM 90.7, KQMN 91.5, and KNTN 102.7. Other nonprofit FM stations include K-Love's K237ER 95.3; and 3ABN's KOBT-LP 101.3. Commercial FM stations include active rock station KJKJ 107.5; top 40/CHR stations KKXL-FM 92.9 and KZGF 94.7; country stations KSNR 100.3 and KYCK 97.1; adult contemporary station KZLT-FM 104.3; contemporary Christian music station KKEQ (K285BG) 104.9, and classic hits station KQHT 96.1.

Grand Forks is part of the Fargo television market, covering eastern North Dakota and western Minnesota. Major television affiliates include WDAZ-TV (ABC), K30LR-D (CBS), KBRR-TV (FOX) and KVLY-TV (NBC).

Infrastructure

Transportation

Public transit
The city maintains a bus system, Cities Area Transit (CAT). It has operated since 1926, when it was introduced to replace an earlier trolley system. There are 12 bus routes, including night service and service in East Grand Forks.

Rail
The BNSF Railway runs track in several directions in and around the city. The Empire Builder stops at the Grand Forks Amtrak station.

Air
Grand Forks International Airport (GFK, KGFK) is served by Delta Air Lines with several daily round trips to Minneapolis-St. Paul International Airport and by Allegiant Air, which operates flights a few times a week to Mesa, Arizona (Phoenix-Gateway), Sanford, Florida (Orlando-Sanford), and Las Vegas, Nevada. A passenger terminal completed in 2011 allows more passengers to come through the airport, improves circulation, has a baggage claim and addresses security and safety concerns. The airport was a major distribution center for FedEx, which conducts flights daily within the state and northern Minnesota, until FedEx moved its flight operations to Fargo in 2016. The airport is one of the busiest in the country, due in large measure to the presence of UND's John D. Odegard School of Aerospace Sciences.

Streets and roads
Within the city, roads that run north to south are generally called "streets" and roads that run east to west are generally called "avenues". Streets are numbered in blocks west of the Red River. Avenues are numbered in blocks north or south of DeMers Avenue, the city's historic dividing route next to the railyards.

Three federal highways pass through Grand Forks: U.S. Route 2, Interstate 29, and U.S. Highway 81. U.S. Highway 2, known as Gateway Drive in the city, runs east to west through the northern part of town and is a four-lane highway. The highway is the primary connection between Grand Forks, East Grand Forks, the Grand Forks Air Force Base, Grand Forks International Airport, and Crookston, Minnesota. Interstate 29 runs north to south along the western part of the city, officially multiplexed with U.S. Highway 81 in the Grand Forks area. The U.S. Highway 81 business route, Washington Street and 32nd Avenue, runs through many of the city's major commercial districts.

Healthcare
With over 4,100 employees and nearly 300 physicians and advanced practice providers (nurse practitioners and physician assistants), Altru Health System is the main provider of health care in Greater Grand Forks and the surrounding region. Serving more than 220,000 residents in northeast North Dakota and northwest Minnesota, Altru provides an array of services. As the first member of the Mayo Clinic Care Network, Altru's providers have access to clinically integrated tools extending Mayo Clinic's knowledge and expertise to patients. Altru is also Grand Forks's largest private employer. Offering all private patient rooms, Altru's Columbia Road Campus includes Altru Hospital (257 beds), Altru Rehabilitation Center (20 beds) and multiple clinics. Altru's South Washington Medical Park features Altru Specialty Center (45 beds), Altru Professional Center and Yorhom Medical Essentials.

The Sanny and Jerry Ryan Center for Prevention and Genetics, housed in Choice Health & Fitness, encourages people to consider preventive measures before it becomes medically necessary to seek care. It is the first of its kind in the region. Truyu Aesthetic Center, with locations in Grand Forks, East Grand Forks and across the region, offers surgical and non-surgical procedures, services and products under Altru's support. Altru is the result of a 1997 merger of United Hospital (formerly Deaconess and St. Michael's Hospitals) and the Grand Forks Clinic.

Grand Forks is also home to several long-term care facilities, serving many of the area's elderly: The Valley Memorial Homes, St. Anne's, Edgewood Parkwood Place, and Maple View Memory Care.

Notable people

Sister cities

Grand Forks sister cities:
Dickinson, North Dakota, US
Sarpsborg, Norway
Awano, Tochigi, Japan (defunct)
Ishim, Tyumen Oblast, Russia (inactive)

Grand Forks has an active sister city program designed to encourage cultural and economic exchanges. Its first sister city was Ishim in the Soviet Union. That relationship formally began in 1984 during the Cold War. Sometime in the late 1990s, political and economic turmoil in Russia ended the relationship. While the relationship with Ishim faded, Grand Forks found a new sister in Awano, Japan. An informal relationship began in 1994 when the school districts of both cities began exchanging students. In 1998, the two formally proclaimed themselves sister cities. The best publicly available testament to the relationship between the two is a Japanese rock garden in Grand Forks's Sertoma Park and a sculpture of an American bison in an Awano park. The annexation of Awano by the larger city of Kanuma led to the end of the sister city relationship, but Kanuma and Grand Forks continue to partner in a yearly educational exchange of high school students. Grand Forks's relationship with Dickinson, North Dakota, began in 2002, when delegations from each city visited the other. Grand Forks Mayor Michael Brown said he thought having friends in western North Dakota, which typically has diverging interests from eastern cities, could help at the state legislature. Sarpsborg, Norway, became a sister city in 2005 after several exchanges among leaders from both cities. The city became interested in building a relationship with Sarpsborg because many Grand Forks residents have Norwegian heritage.

References

Further reading
 Tweton, Jerome D. (1986, reprinted 2005). Grand Forks, A Pictorial History, Norfolk, Virginia: The Donning Company.
 Bladow, Eldon (Ed., 1974). They Came To Stay, Grand Forks, North Dakota: Grand Forks Centennial Corporations.
 Jacobs, Mike (Ed., 1997). Come Hell and High Water, Grand Forks, North Dakota: Knight-Ridder.

External links

 City of Grand Forks official website
 Grand Forks Herald website
 Grand Forks Convention and Visitors Bureau website
 Grand Forks Region Economic Development Corporation (EDC)
 City of Grand Forks, North Dakota (1952) from the Digital Horizons website
 
Historic Grand Forks : a walking tour guide (1986) from the Digital Horizons website
The Future of Grand Forks : shaping the space we live in (1975) from the Digital Horizons website
They came to stay : Grand Forks, North Dakota Centennial 1874–1974 from the Digital Horizons website

 
Populated places established in 1870
Cities in Grand Forks County, North Dakota
Greater Grand Forks
Cities in North Dakota
County seats in North Dakota
Hudson's Bay Company trading posts
1870 establishments in Dakota Territory